Paul Tate may refer to:

Paul Tate, character in The Manhunter
Paul Tate, member of the band UGA Accidentals
Paul Tate (soccer) in All-time El Paso Patriots roster
Paul Tate (businessman), indicted in United States v. Scheinberg

See also
Paul Tait (disambiguation)